PDZ and LIM domain protein 5 is a protein that in humans is encoded by the PDLIM5 gene.

The protein encoded by this gene is a LIM domain protein. LIM domains are cysteine-rich double zinc fingers composed of 50 to 60 amino acids that are involved in protein-protein interactions. LIM domain-containing proteins are scaffolds for the formation of multiprotein complexes. The proteins are involved in cytoskeleton organization, cell lineage specification, organ development, and oncogenesis. The encoded protein is also a member of the Enigma class of proteins, a family of proteins that possess a 100-amino acid PDZ domain in the N-terminus and 1 to 3 LIM domains in the C terminus. Multiple transcript variants encoding different isoforms have been found for this gene, although not all of them have been fully characterized.

Interactions
PDLIM5 has been shown to interact with PRKCB1.

References

Further reading

Biology of bipolar disorder